The Asiatic lion, also known as the Persian lion, is a population of Panthera leo leo that today survives in the wild only in India. Since the turn of the 20th century, its range has been restricted to Gir National Park and the surrounding areas in the Indian state of Gujarat. Historically, it inhabited much of southwest Asia to northern India.

The first scientific description of the Asiatic lion was published in 1826 by the Austrian zoologist Johann N. Meyer, who named it Felis leo persicus. On the IUCN Red List, it is listed under its former scientific name Panthera leo persica as Endangered because of its small population size and area of occupancy. Until the 19th century, it occurred in Saudi Arabia, eastern Turkey, Iran, Mesopotamia, Pakistan, and from east of the Indus River to Bengal and the Narmada River in Central India.

The population has steadily increased since 2010. In August 2017, surveyors counted 650 wild lions. In June 2020, an estimation exercise counted 674 Asiatic lions in the Gir forest region, an increase of 29% over the 2015 census figure.

The lion is one of five pantherine cats native to India, along with the Bengal tiger (P. tigris tigris), Indian leopard (P. pardus fusca), snow leopard (P. uncia) and clouded leopard (Neofelis nebulosa).

Taxonomy 
Felis leo persicus was the scientific name proposed by Johann N. Meyer in 1826 who described an Asiatic lion skin from Persia.
In the 19th century, several zoologists described lion zoological specimen from other parts of Asia that used to be considered synonyms of P. l. persica:
Felis leo bengalensis proposed by Edward Turner Bennett in 1829 was a lion kept in the menagerie of the Tower of London. Bennett's essay contains a drawing titled 'Bengal lion'.
Felis leo goojratensis proposed by Walter Smee in 1833 was based on two skins of maneless lions from Gujarat that Smee exhibited in a meeting of the Zoological Society of London.
Leo asiaticus proposed by Sir William Jardine, 7th Baronet in 1834 was a lion from India.
Felis leo indicus proposed by Henri Marie Ducrotay de Blainville in 1843 was based on an Asiatic lion skull.

In 2017, the Asiatic lion was subsumed to P. l. leo due to close morphological and molecular genetic similarities with Barbary lion specimens.
However, several scientists continue using P. l. persica for the Asiatic lion.

Evolution 

Fossil remains of Panthera spelaea excavated in the Cromer Stage indicate that it represented a genetically isolated and highly distinct lineage, not closely related to Asiatic lions. Fossil lion remains were found in Pleistocene deposits in West Bengal. A fossil carnassial excavated in the Batadomba Cave indicates that the Sri Lanka lion (P. l. sinhaleyus) inhabited Sri Lanka during the late Pleistocene, and is thought to have become extinct around 39,000 years ago. Deraniyagala described this lion in 1939.

Phylogeography 
Results of a phylogeographic analysis based on mtDNA sequences of lions from across the global range, including now extinct populations like Barbary lions, indicates that sub-Saharan African lions are phylogenetically basal to all modern lions. These findings support an African origin of modern lion evolution with a probable centre in East and Southern Africa. It is likely that lions migrated from there to West Africa, eastern North Africa and via the periphery of the Arabian Peninsula into Turkey, southern Europe and northern India during the last 20,000 years. The Sahara, Congolian rainforests and the Great Rift Valley are natural barriers to lion dispersal.

Genetic markers of 357 samples from captive and wild lions from Africa and India were examined. Results indicate four lineages of lion populations: one in Central and North Africa to Asia, one in Kenya, one in Southern Africa, and one in Southern and East Africa; the first wave of lion expansion probably occurred about 118,000 years ago from East Africa into West Asia, and the second wave in the late Pleistocene or early Holocene periods from Southern Africa towards East Africa.
The Asiatic lion is genetically closer to North and West African lions than to the group comprising East and Southern African lions. The two groups probably diverged about 186,000–128,000 years ago. It is thought that the Asiatic lion remained connected to North and Central African lions until gene flow was interrupted due to extinction of lions in Western Eurasia and the Middle East during the Holocene.

Asiatic lions are less genetically diverse than African lions, which may be the result of a founder effect in the recent history of the remnant population in the Gir Forest.

Characteristics 

The Asiatic lion's fur ranges in colour from ruddy-tawny, heavily speckled with black, to sandy or buffish grey, sometimes with a silvery sheen in certain lighting. Males have only moderate mane growth at the top of the head, so that their ears are always visible. About half of Asiatic lions' skulls from the Gir forest have divided infraorbital foramina, whereas African lions have only one foramen on either side. The sagittal crest is more strongly developed, and the post-orbital area is shorter than in African lions. It differs from the African lion by a larger tail tuft and less inflated auditory bullae.
The most striking morphological character of the Asiatic lion is a longitudinal fold of skin running along its belly.

The Gir lion is similar in size to the Central African lion, and smaller than large African lions.
An adult male Asiatic lion weighs  on average with the limit being ; a wild female weighs .

Manes 

Colour and development of manes in male lions varies between regions, among populations and with age of lions. In general, the Asiatic lion differs from the African lion by a less developed mane. The manes of most lions in ancient Greece and Asia Minor were also less developed and did not extend to below the belly, sides or ulnas. Lions with such smaller manes were also known in the Syrian region, Arabian Peninsula and Egypt.

Exceptionally sized lions 
In 1841, English traveller Austen Henry Layard accompanied hunters in Khuzestan, Iran, and sighted a lion which "had done much damage in the plain of Ram Hormuz," before one of his companions killed it. He described it as being "unusually large and of very dark brown colour", with some parts of its body being almost black.
In 1935, a British admiral claimed to have sighted a maneless lion near Quetta in Pakistan. He wrote "It was a large lion, very stocky, light tawny in colour, and I may say that no one of us three had the slightest doubt of what we had seen until, on our arrival at Quetta, many officers expressed doubts as to its identity, or to the possibility of there being a lion in the district."

Distribution and habitat 

This sanctuary and the surrounding areas are the only habitats supporting the Asiatic lion. After 1965, a national park was established covering an area of  where human activity is not allowed. In the surrounding sanctuary only Maldharis have the right to take their livestock for grazing.

Lions inhabit remnant forest habitats in the two hill systems of Gir and Girnar that comprise Gujarat's largest tracts of tropical and subtropical dry broadleaf forests, thorny forest and savanna, and provide valuable habitat for a diverse flora and fauna. Five protected areas currently exist to protect the Asiatic lion: Gir Sanctuary, Gir National Park, Pania Sanctuary, Mitiyala Sanctuary, and Girnar Sanctuary. The first three protected areas form the Gir Conservation Area, a  large forest block that represents the core habitat of the lion population. The other two sanctuaries Mitiyala and Girnar protect satellite areas within dispersal distance of the Gir Conservation Area. An additional sanctuary is being established in the nearby Barda Wildlife Sanctuary to serve as an alternative home for lions.

The lion population recovered from the brink of extinction to 411 individuals by 2010. In that year, approximately 105 lions lived outside the Gir forest, representing a quarter of the entire lion population. Dispersing sub-adults established new territories outside their natal prides, and as a result the satellite lion population has been increasing since 1995.
The Asiatic Lion Census conducted in 2017 revealed about 650 individuals.

By 2020, at least six satellite populations had spread to eight districts in Gujarat and live in human-dominated areas outside the protected area network.

Former range 

The Asiatic lion used to occur in Arabia, Palestine, Mesopotamia and Baluchistan. In South Caucasia (present day Armenia, Georgia, and Azerbaijan), it was known since the Holocene, and became extinct in the 10th century. Until the middle of the 19th century, it survived in regions adjoining Mesopotamia and Syria, and was still sighted in the upper reaches of the Euphrates River in the early 1870s. By the late 19th century, the Asiatic lion had become extinct in Saudi Arabia and Turkey. The last known lion in Iraq was killed on the lower Tigris in 1918.

Historical records in Iran indicate that it ranged from the Khuzestan Plain to Fars Province at elevations below  in steppe vegetation and pistachio-almond woodlands. It was widespread in the country, but in the 1870s, it was sighted only on the western slopes of the Zagros Mountains, and in the forest regions south of Shiraz. It served as the national emblem and appeared on the country's flag. In 1944, the corpse of a lioness was found on the banks of the Karun River in Iran's Khuzestan Province.

In India, the Asiatic lion occurred in Sind, Bahawalpur, Punjab, Gujarat, Rajasthan, Haryana, Bihar and eastward as far as Palamau and Rewa, Madhya Pradesh in the early 19th century. It once ranged to Bangladesh in the east and up to Narmada River in the south.
Because of the lion's restricted distribution in India, Reginald Innes Pocock assumed that it arrived from Europe, entering southwestern Asia through Balochistan only recently, before humans started limiting its dispersal in the country. The advent and increasing availability of firearms led to its local extirpation over large areas.
Heavy hunting by British colonial officers and Indian rulers caused a steady and marked decline of lion numbers in the country. Lions were exterminated in Palamau by 1814, in Baroda, Hariana and Ahmedabad district in the 1830s, in Kot Diji and Damoh in the 1840s. During the Indian Rebellion of 1857, a British officer shot 300 lions. The last lions of Gwalior and Rewah were shot in the 1860s. One lion was killed near Allahabad in 1866. The last lion of Mount Abu in Rajasthan was spotted in 1872. By the late 1870s, lions were extinct in Rajasthan. By 1880, no lion survived in Guna, Deesa and Palanpur districts, and only about a dozen lions were left in Junagadh district. By the turn of the century, the Gir Forest held the only Asiatic lion population in India, which was protected by the Nawab of Junagarh in his private hunting grounds.

Ecology and behaviour 

Male Asiatic lions are solitary, or associate with up to three males, forming a loose pride. Pairs of males rest, hunt and feed together, and display marking behaviour at the same sites. Females associate with up to 12 females, forming a stronger pride together with their cubs. They share large carcasses among each other, but seldom with males. Female and male lions usually associate only for a few days when mating, but rarely live and feed together.

During hot and dry seasons, they favour densely vegetated and shady riverine habitats, where prey species also congregate.

Coalitions of males defend home ranges containing one or more female prides.
Together, they hold a territory for a longer time than single lions. Males in coalitions of three to four individuals exhibit a pronounced hierarchy with one male dominating the others.

The lions in Gir National Park are active at twilight and by night, showing a high temporal overlap with sambar (Rusa unicolor), wild boar (Sus scrofa) and nilgai (Boselaphus tragocamelus).

Feeding ecology 
Domestic cattle have historically been a major component of the Asiatic lions' diet in the Gir Forest.
Inside Gir Forest National Park, lions predominantly kill chital (Axis axis), sambar deer, nilgai, cattle (Bos taurus), domestic water buffalo (Bubalus bubalis), and less frequently wild boar. They prey on sambar deer when the latter descend from the hills during summer. Outside the protected area where wild prey species do not occur, lions prey on water buffalo and cattle, and rarely on dromedary (Camelus dromedarius).
They regularly visit specific sites within the protected area to scavenge on dead livestock dumped by Maldhari livestock herders.
During dry, hot months, they also prey on mugger crocodiles (Crocodylus palustris) on the banks of Kamleshwar Dam.

In 1974, the Forest Department estimated the wild ungulate population at 9,650 individuals. In the following decades, the wild ungulate population has grown consistently to 31,490 in 1990 and 64,850 in 2010, including 52,490 chital, 4,440 wild boar, 4,000 sambar, 2,890 nilgai, 740 chinkara (Gazella bennetti), and 290 four-horned antelope (Tetracerus quadricornis). In contrast, populations of domestic buffalo and cattle declined following resettlement, largely due to direct removal of resident livestock from the Gir Conservation Area. The population of 24,250 domestic livestock in the 1970s declined to 12,500 by the mid-1980s, but increased to 23,440 animals in 2010. Following changes in both predator and prey communities, Asiatic lions shifted their predation patterns. Today, very few livestock kills occur within the sanctuary, and instead most occur in peripheral villages. Depredation records indicate that in and around the Gir Forest, lions killed on average 2,023 livestock annually between 2005 and 2009, and an additional 696 individuals in satellite areas.

Dominant males consume about 47% more from kills than their coalition partners. Aggression between partners increases when coalitions are large, but kills are small.

Reproduction 

Asiatic lions mate foremost between October and November. Mating lasts three to six days. During these days, they usually do not hunt, but only drink water. Gestation lasts about 110 days. Litters comprise one to four cubs.
The average interval between births is 24 months, unless cubs die due to infanticide by adult males or because of diseases and injuries. Cubs become independent at the age of about two years. Subadult males leave their natal pride latest at the age of three years and become nomads until they establish their own territory.
Dominant males mate more frequently than their coalition partners. During a study carried out between December 2012 and December 2016, three females were observed switching mating partners in favour of the dominant male. Monitoring of more than 70 mating events showed that females mated with males of several rivaling prides that shared their home ranges, and that these males were tolerant toward the same cubs. Only new males that entered the female territories killed unfamiliar cubs. Young females mated foremost with males within their home ranges. Older females selected males at the periphery of their home ranges.

Threats 

The Asiatic lion currently exists as a single subpopulation, and is thus vulnerable to extinction from unpredictable events, such as an epidemic or large forest fire. There are indications of poaching incidents in recent years, as well as reports that organized poacher gangs have switched attention from local Bengal tigers to the Gujarat lions. There have also been a number of drowning incidents, after lions fell into wells.

Prior to the resettlement of Maldharis, the Gir forest was heavily degraded and used by livestock, which competed with and restricted the population sizes of native ungulates. Various studies reveal tremendous habitat recovery and increases in wild ungulate populations following the resettlement of Maldharis since the 1970s.

Nearly 25 lions in the vicinity of Gir Forest were found dead in October 2018. Four of them had died because of canine distemper virus, the same virus that had also killed several lions in the Serengeti.

Conflicts with humans 
Since the mid 1990s, the Asiatic lion population has increased to an extent that by 2015, about a third resided outside the protected area. Hence, conflict between local residents and wildlife also increased. Local people protect their crops from nilgai, wild boar, and other herbivores by using electrical fences that are powered with high voltage. Some consider the presence of predators a benefit, as they keep the herbivore population in check. But some also fear the lions, and killed several in retaliation for attacks on livestock.

This was the second attack by a lion in this area, six months after a 25-year-old man was attacked and killed in Dhodadar.

Conservation 
Panthera leo persica was included on CITES Appendix I, and is fully protected in India, where it is considered Endangered.

Reintroduction

India 

In the 1950s, biologists advised the Indian government to re-establish at least one wild population in the Asiatic lion's former range to ensure the population's reproductive health and to prevent it from being affected by an outbreak of an epidemic. In 1956, the Indian Board for Wildlife accepted a proposal by the Government of Uttar Pradesh to establish a new sanctuary for the envisaged reintroduction, Chandra Prabha Wildlife Sanctuary, covering  in eastern Uttar Pradesh, where climate, terrain and vegetation is similar to the conditions in the Gir Forest. In 1957, one male and two female wild-caught Asiatic lions were set free in the sanctuary. This population comprised 11 animals in 1965, which all disappeared thereafter.

The Asiatic Lion Reintroduction Project to find an alternative habitat for reintroducing Asiatic lions was pursued in the early 1990s. Biologists from the Wildlife Institute of India assessed several potential translocation sites for their suitability regarding existing prey population and habitat conditions. The Palpur-Kuno Wildlife Sanctuary in northern Madhya Pradesh was ranked as the most promising location, followed by Sita Mata Wildlife Sanctuary and Darrah National Park. Until 2000, 1,100 families from 16 villages had been resettled from the Palpur-Kuno Wildlife Sanctuary, and another 500 families from eight villages were expected to be resettled.

Gujarat state officials resisted the relocation, since it would make the Gir Sanctuary lose its status as the world's only home of the Asiatic lion. Gujarat raised a number of objections to the proposal, and thus the matter went before the Indian Supreme Court. In April 2013, the Indian Supreme Court ordered the Gujarat state to send some of their Gir lions to Madhya Pradesh to establish a second population there. The court had given wildlife authorities six months to complete the transfer. The number of lions and which ones to be transported will be decided at a later date. As of now, the plan to shift lions to Kuno is in jeopardy, with Madhya Pradesh having apparently given up on acquiring lions from Gujarat.

Iran 

In 1977, Iran attempted to restore its lion population by transporting Gir lions to Arzhan National Park, but the project met resistance from the local population, and thus it was not implemented. However, this did not stop Iran from seeking to bring back the lion. In February 2019, Tehran Zoological Garden obtained a male Asiatic lion from Bristol Zoo in the United Kingdom, followed in June by a female from Dublin Zoo. There are hopes for them to successfully reproduce.

In captivity 

Until the late 1990s, captive Asiatic lions in Indian zoos were haphazardly interbred with African lions confiscated from circuses, leading to genetic pollution in the captive Asiatic lion stock. Once discovered, this led to the complete shutdown of the European and American endangered species breeding programs for Asiatic lions, as its founder animals were captive-bred Asiatic lions originally imported from India and were ascertained to be intraspecific hybrids of African and Asian lions. In North American zoos, several Indian-African lion crosses were inadvertently bred, and researchers noted that "the fecundity, reproductive success, and spermatozoal development improved dramatically."

DNA fingerprinting studies of Asiatic lions have helped in identifying individuals with high genetic variability, which can be used for conservation breeding programs.

In 2006, the Central Zoo Authority of India stopped breeding Indian-African cross lions stating that "hybrid lions have no conservation value and it is not worth to spend resources on them". Now only pure native Asiatic lions are bred in India.

In 1972 the Sakkarbaug Zoo sold a pair of young pure-stock lions to the Fauna Preservation Society; which decided they would be accommodated at the Jersey Wildlife Trust where it was hoped to begin a captive breeding programme.

The Asiatic lion International Studbook was initiated in 1977, followed in 1983 by the North American Species Survival Plan (SSP). 
The North American population of captive Asiatic lions was composed of descendants of five founder lions, three of which were pure Asian and two were African or African-Asian hybrids. The lions kept in the framework of the SSP consisted of animals with high inbreeding coefficients.

In the early 1990s, three European zoos imported pure Asiatic lions from India: London Zoo obtained two pairs; the Zürich Zoologischer Garten one pair; and the Korkeasaari Zoo in Helsinki one male and two females. In 1994, the European Endangered Species Programme (EEP) for Asiatic lions was initiated. The European Association of Zoos and Aquaria (EAZA) published the first European Studbook in 1999. By 2005, there were 80 Asiatic lions kept in the EEP — the only captive population outside of India.
As of 2009, more than 100 Asiatic lions were kept within the EEP. The SSP had not resumed; pure-bred Asiatic lions are needed to form a new founder population for breeding in American zoos.

In culture

South and East Asia 

Neolithic cave paintings of lions were found in Bhimbetka rock shelters in central India, which are at least 30,000 years old.

The Sanskrit name of Sri Lanka is Sinhala meaning 'Abode of Lions'.

In Hindu mythology, the half man half lion avatar Narasimha is the fourth incarnation of Vishnu.
Simhamukha is a lion-faced protector and dakini in Tibetan Buddhism.

In the 18th book of the Mahabharata, Bharata deprives lions of their prowess.
The lion plays a prominent role in The Fables of Pilpay that were translated into Persian, Greek and Hebrew languages between the 8th and 12th centuries.
The lion is the symbol of Mahavira, the 24th and last Tirthankara in Jainism.
The lion is the third animal of the Burmese zodiac and the sixth animal of the Sinhalese zodiac.
The earliest known Chinese stone sculptures of lions date to the Han dynasty at the turn of the first millennium.
The lion dance is a traditional dance in Chinese culture that is strongly associated with Buddhism and known since at least the Han dynasty.
 Cambodia has a native martial art called Bokator (pounding a lion).

West Asia and Europe 

Lions are depicted on vases dating to about 2600 before present that were excavated near Lake Urmia in Iran.
The lion was an important symbol in Ancient Iraq and is depicted in a stone relief at Nineveh in the Mesopotamian Plain.
 The lion makes repeated appearances in the Bible, most notably as having fought Samson in the Book of Judges.
 Having occurred in the Arab world, particularly the Arabian Peninsula, the Asiatic lion has significance in Arab and Islamic culture. For example, Surat al-Muddaththir of the Quran criticizes people who were averse to the Islamic Prophet Muhammad's teachings, such as that the rich have an obligation to donate wealth to the poor, comparing their attitude to itself, with the response of prey to a qaswarah (meaning "lion", "beast of prey", or "hunter"). Other Arabic words for 'lion' include asad and sabaʿ, and they can be used as names of places, or titles of people. An Arabic toponym for the Levantine City of Beersheba can mean "Spring of the Lion." Hamzah ibn Abdul-Muttalib who were loyal kinsmen of Muhammad, were given titles like Asad Allah.
 The lion of Babylon is a statue at the Ishtar Gate in Babylon The lion has an important association with the figure Gilgamesh, as demonstrated in his epic. The Iraqi national football team is nicknamed "Lions of Mesopotamia."
 The symbol of the lion is closely tied to the Persian people. Achaemenid kings were known to carry the symbol of the lion on their thrones and garments. The name 'Shir' (also pronounced 'Sher') is a part of the names of many places in Iran and Central Asia, like those of city of Shiraz and the Sherabad River, and had been adopted into other languages, like Hindi. The Shir-va-Khorshid ("Lion and Sun") is one of the most prominent symbols of Iran, dating back to the Safavid dynasty, and was used on the flag of Iran until 1979. 
 The lion was an objective of hunting in the Caucasus, by both locals and foreigners. The locals were called 'Shirvanshakhs'.
 The Nemean lion of pre-literate Greek myth is associated with the Labours of Herakles.
 A Bronze Age statue of a lion from either Southern Italy or southern Spain from around 1000–1200 years BCE, the "Mari-Cha Lion", was exhibited at the Louvre Abu Dhabi.

See also 
 Lion populations: Cape lion  Lions in Europe 

 Wildlife of Iran
 Wildlife of India
 In situ conservation
 Ex situ conservation
 Panthera leo fossilis
 Panthera spelaea
 Damnatio ad bestias

References

Further reading

External links 

 IUCN/SSC Cat Specialist Group: Asiatic lion
The Telegraph, August 2018: Pride of India
 
 Asiatic Lion Protection Society (ALPS), Gujarat, India
 ARKive.org: Lion (Panthera leo) 
 Animal Diversity Web: Panthera leo
 Asiatic lions in online video (3 videos)
 Asiatic Lions Images
  by Rajesh Badal (2011)
 DB Video Special Report on Asiatic lion in Gujarati: What Is the connection Between Gir lions and Africans lions
 Skin of a Persian lioness, belonging to an endangered subspecies of lions, brought to Dublin by King Edward VII in 1902 (during the reign of Shah Mozaffar ad-Din in Persia, and kept in the Natural History Museum (Ireland)).
 Lion of Basrah
 A lion in Iraq
 Stuffed animals including Pakistan's last wild lion at Bahawalpur Zoo
 Ancient Arabian account of Muhammad's descendant Musa al-Kadhim encountering a lion outside Medina in the mountainous region of the Hejaz
 Description of the Arabian lion and art
 4 انواع الأسود في العالم الأسد العربي الجزء (in Arabic)
 الاسد العربي المنقرض عند العرب lion Arabian Extinct (in Arabic)
 Asiatic lioness on a tree

Articles containing video clips
Felids of Asia
Felids of India
Fauna of Gujarat
Panthera leo leo
Mammals described in 1826
Symbols of Gujarat